USS Hero (1861), a wooden schooner, was purchased by the Union Navy during the American Civil War  at Baltimore, Maryland, 13 August 1861 to obstruct inlets to Pamlico Sound, North Carolina, near Cape Hatteras. 

She was apparently sunk in Ocracoke Inlet 14 November 1861 with two other schooners of the stone fleet.

References
 

Ships of the Union Navy
Ships of the Stone Fleet